Mount Emison is a prominent mountain,  high, rising on the west side of Campbell Glacier, just north of the mouth of Bates Glacier, in the Deep Freeze Range, Victoria Land. It was mapped by the United States Geological Survey from surveys and U.S. Navy air photos, 1955–63, and was named by the Advisory Committee on Antarctic Names after William B. Emison, a biologist at McMurdo Station, 1964–65 and 1965–66 seasons.

References 

Mountains of Victoria Land
Scott Coast